Jimtown is an unincorporated community in Baker County, Oregon, United States. It is about two miles northwest of Halfway, on Oregon Route 413.

Jimtown was originally named Langrell, after early resident Richard T. Langrell, a sawmill owner who opened a store in the community in 1904. In 1910 Langrell sold the store to James H. Chandler, who ran it until 1916. He is the "Jim" for whom the town was renamed. Jimtown became the official name in a 1987 United States Board on Geographic Names decision.

References

External links
Historic images of Jimtown from Baker County Library

Unincorporated communities in Baker County, Oregon
1904 establishments in Oregon
Populated places established in 1904
Unincorporated communities in Oregon